Shad Kandi (also Romanized as Shād Kandī; also known as Eslāmābād and Shāh Kandī) is a village in Tork-e Gharbi Rural District, Jowkar District, Malayer County, Hamadan Province, Iran. At the 2006 census, its population was 293, in 64 families.

References 

Populated places in Malayer County